Al-Zahrani, al-Zahrani or Alzahrani (: denoting a relationship to the Zahran tribe); is a surname in Saudi Arabia for the third royal family members . Notable people with the surname include:

Fahad Al-Zahrani (born 1979), Saudi Arabian footballer
Faris al-Zahrani (1977–2016), Saudi Arabian al-Qaeda member
Khamis Al-Zahrani (born 1976), Saudi Arabian footballer
Saad Al-Zahrani (born 1980), Saudi Arabian footballer
Saeed Al-Zahrani (born 1992), Saudi Arabian footballer
Asaad Al-Zahrani (born 1975) Saudi Arabian actor known for Comnedo (2009), Wi-Fi- (2013) and Selfie (2015)
Faisal Al-Zahrani, Saudi Arabian endocrinologist
Haitham Al-Zahrani, Saudi Arabian heart surgeon
Khalid Al-Zahrani, Saudi Arabian neurosurgeon

See also
Yasser Talal Al Zahrani (1984-2006), Saudi Arabian man detained in Guantanamo Bay

Arabic-language surnames